John Robert "Jack" Nicholson,  (December 1, 1901 – October 8, 1983) was a Canadian lawyer, businessman, politician and the 21st Lieutenant Governor of British Columbia.

Born in Newcastle, New Brunswick (now Miramichi), he graduated from the Dalhousie University law school in Halifax. In 1924, he moved to Vancouver, British Columbia and practised law.

During World War II, he was a deputy controller in the Department of Munitions and Supplies. From 1942 to 1951, he was the head of a crown corporation, Polymer Corporation, and from 1952 to 1956, the head of Brazilian Light and Power Co in Rio de Janeiro.

In 1962, Nicholson was elected to Canadian House of Commons for the riding of Vancouver Centre and was re-elected in 1963 and 1965. From 1963 to 1964, he was the Minister of Forestry. From 1964 to 1965, he was the Postmaster General. In 1965, he was the Minister of Citizenship and Immigration. From 1965 to 1968, he was the Minister of Labour.

From 1968 to 1973, he served as the Lieutenant Governor of British Columbia.

Electoral history

External links
Biography from the website of the Lieutenant Governor of British Columbia
 

1901 births
1983 deaths
Schulich School of Law alumni
Lawyers in British Columbia
Canadian King's Counsel
Postmasters General of Canada
Lieutenant Governors of British Columbia
Liberal Party of Canada MPs
Members of the House of Commons of Canada from British Columbia
Members of the King's Privy Council for Canada
Members of the United Church of Canada
Canadian Officers of the Order of the British Empire
People from Miramichi, New Brunswick
20th-century Canadian lawyers